This is a list of Towson Tigers players in the NFL Draft.

Key

Selections

References

Lists of National Football League draftees by college football team

Towson Tigers NFL Draft